Prawet is one of the 50 districts of Bangkok, Thailand. It is in the southeast.  Neighboring districts are (from the east clockwise) Bang Phli (Samut Prakan province), Bang Na, Phra Khanong, Suan Luang, Bang Kapi, Saphan Sung and Lat Krabang (Bangkok).

History
Prawet was once part of Phra Khanong District. Prawet was elevated to become a separate district in 1989. Part of Prawet, especially the Suan Luang Sub-district, was carved out to establish Suan Luang District on 14 January 1994.

Its name after Khlong Prawet Burirom, a canal that flows through the northern area.

In October 2005 the plan to create the special administrative area Nakhon Suvarnabhumi around the new Bangkok airport became public. Prawet was supposed to be one of five districts to be included in this new area.

Administration
The district is sub-divided into three sub-districts (khwaeng).

Places

Education
Pan-Asia International School
Wells International School (Wells International Kindergarten Bangna Campus)

Place of worship
Masjid Assa'adah 
Wat Kaeo Phithak Charoen Tham
Wat Krathum Suea Pla
Wat Taklam
Yami Ul Ibadah (also known as Masjid Ban Tang Khawi)

Public park
Chaloem Phrakiat Mahat Thai Park
Nong Bon Water Sports Center
PTT Metro Forest Learning Center
Suan Luang Rama IX
Suan Wanatham Park

Shopping center
Paradise Park (formerly Seri Center)
Seacon Square
Srinagarindra Train Night Market

Transportation
Srinagarindra Road is a main artery of the district, Chaloem Phra Kiat Ratchakan Thi 9 and Phatthanakan with On Nut (Sukhumvit 77) as well as Sukhaphiban 2 Roads considered as a minor road. Kanchanaphisek Road (Outer Ring Road) passes through the eastern area. Prawet is served by Ban Thap Chang Station of the State Railway of Thailand, whose eastern line and airport rail link runs past the area.

References

External links

 Official website of the district (Thai)
 BMA website with the tourist landmarks of Prawet 
 Suan Luang Rama IX

 
Districts of Bangkok